Liang Guanhua (born 30 September 1964) is a Chinese actor best known for his role as Di Renjie on Amazing Detective Di Renjie and its sequels.

Early life and education
Liang was born in Beijing on September 30, 1964. In 1981, he was accepted to Beijing People's Art Theatre. After graduating in 1984, he joined the theatre as an actor.

Acting career
Liang became widely known to audiences with The Happy Life of Talkative Zhang Damin (1998), in which he played in the lead role of Zhang Damin.

In 2003, Liang's big break came when Qian Yanqiu cast him in Amazing Detective Di Renjie, in which he played Di Renjie, a role which brought him much publicity. He reprised in three sequels, Amazing Detective Di Renjie 2, Amazing Detective Di Renjie 3, and Amazing Detective Di Renjie 4.

In 2004, he had a supporting role in the historical television series Xianfeng Dynasty: Fantasies Behind A Curtain. That same year, he had a minor role in the  black comedy film Keep Cool, starring Li Baotian, Jiang Wen, Ge You and Qu Ying and directed by Zhang Yimou. 

Liang landed a guest starring role on Crazy Dinner Party in 2012, opposite actors Fan Wei, Huang Bo, Liu Hua, and Monica Mok.

In 2014, he portrayed Bao Zheng in the wuxia television series The Three Heroes and Five Gallants.

Liang joined the main cast of the biographical television series Yuan Chonghuan as Wei Zhongxian, a court eunuch and villain role of the series.

In 2019, he starred with Yao Chen, Yuan Hong and Li Jiuxiao in Send Me to the Clouds. That same year, he gained national fame for his starring role as Hongxi Emperor in the television series Ming dynasty, adapted from Lianjing Zhuyi's network novel The Chronicle of the Six Eras.

Personal life
Liang married Tang Ye, an actress who also worked at Beijing People's Art Theatre.

Filmography

Film

Television

Drama

Drama Awards

Film and TV Awards

References

External links

1964 births
Living people
Male actors from Beijing
Chinese male film actors
Chinese male television actors
21st-century Chinese male actors